Pakol is a soft, flat, rolled-up, round-topped men's cap, usually worn in Afghanistan and Pakistan. It is typically made of wool and found in a variety of earthy colours, such as brown, black, grey, ivory, or dyed red using walnut. The Pakol is believed to have originated in Chitral, or Gilgit-Baltistan in Pakistan.

Description 
The pakol  essentially is worn like a beret: a wearer can regulate and adjust the sizes to fit the weather, mood and sizes and can be used for many functions if needed. The pakol itself is very practical and comfortable. It is especially good for colder climates. Men wear the pakol all year round in colder climates, as the hat works excellent for protection against the cold, wind, and sun. Because of the fine natural wool used to make a pakol, the head does not sweat, or freeze, no matter what the weather is. The material is hygroscopic, yet the hat does not feel wet in rainy weather, nor does it dry. This makes it an especially good headwear for Pakistan and Afghanistan.

It is a handspun woollen cap, formed with a flat, rounded top, encircled by a lower, curled-up brim. It is usually white, grey, or various shades of brown. The cap's practical design allows pulling it down to cover the ears and neck in cold weather and rolling it up for warmer temperatures. There are many ways of decorating the garment, sometimes typically putting flowers or feathers into the hat, especially for festive occasions. An attached string sewn around the base provides adaptability and flexibility of use. By tightening or loosening the string, the wearer is able to secure the hat as needed.

Origins and history 

The pakol traces its origins in Chitral, or more precisely in Gilgit, Astore and surrounding areas of Gilgit-Baltistan in Pakistan. The woollen cap has been the staple headgear of the Shina people and the Kho people (also known as Chitralis), for centuries. It was also adopted recently by several communities of Afghanistan such as Pashtuns, Tajiks and Nuristanis. It was adopted first among the Pashtuns of Pakistan as a replacement for the large turban, especially in the main cities, as for instance in Peshawar, thanks to Chitrali traders and businessmen, who were also responsible for spreading the popularity of the Chitrali cap or pakol, initially expanding their businesses, eventually coming to dominate a large area of the Peshawar's old city, popularly known as Qissa Kahwani. Only in the tribal areas along the Afghan border the traditional Pashtun turban was still popular. However, pictures from Peshawar from not so very long ago, still show a city dominated by turbans instead of men covering their head with a pakol.

Recently, it was also introduced in the Kashmir Valley by seasonal migrants of ethnic Shins hailing from the Gurez and Tuleil areas in north Kashmir's Bandipore district. Today the pakol commonly worn by people of all social classes and backgrounds from Pakistan and Afghanistan, as well as in parts of India, such as in Jammu and Kashmir and Delhi.

Kausia and refutation of Macedonian link 

Some authors compared this typical headgear to the kausia worn by the ancient Macedonians. It then proved tempting for some writers to link the pakol to the Indian campaigns of Alexander the Great in the late fourth century BC. The pakol was also connected to the Greco-Bactrian and Indo-Greek kingdoms of the ensuing centuries. However, the pakol has no historical links with the kausia. According to another erroneous belief of the place of its direct origins, the pakol has a very recent history in Nuristan Province, where it is widely worn nowadays, going back no older than the late nineteenth century, but the same headgear is also relatively young in neighbouring Chitral District.

The direct origins of the pakol are placed in the extreme north of modern Pakistan, in present-day Gilgit-Baltistan, and belong to a wider horizon of similarly shaped headgear worn in the Chinese/Turkestani/Indian borderlands. The simple cap with rolled-rim was worn all over the area, from where it spread further west, towards the Chitral area where it was widely worn by the late 1920s. Apparently at some time the people of Chitral and adjoining regions started to include an extra round piece of material to form a flat crown. This modern twist is not a feature that Alexander's soldiers could have picked up in the late fourth century BC.

Origin, discovery and documentation in Gilgit and Chitral 

The modern variant of pakol originated from Chitral. The hat is also known as khapol, derived from the word kapaal which means head in Khowar language. The main source of production is Chitral in Pakistan. The Pakol is mentioned in Donatus O'Briens' 1895 book on The language of Chitral, where describing the ethnic dress of the Kho people he states that:

"The dress worn by most men consist of a homespun cap black, brown or grey made in the shape of a bag and rolled up until it fits the skull."

Later in 1896 George Scott Robertson described a "Chitrali Cap".

John Biddulph in his Tribes of the Hindoo Koosh (1880), referred to the "rolled woollen cap" and ascribed it to the Shina people of Gilgit, Astore and the surrounding areas in present-day northern Pakistan. Biddulph also tells that in other parts to the west of modern northern Pakistan, such as Wakhan, Chitral and Sarikol, the people used to wear small turbans.

"In Chitral, Wakhan and Sirikol the men wear very small scanty turbans. In Gilgit, Astor, and the greater part of Yaghestan the rolled woollen cap mentioned by Mr. Drew is commonly worn. In the Shin caste unmarried women are distinguished by a white cap, which is never worn by married Shin women."

The earliest unequivocal reference to the pakol thus refers to the extreme north of modern Pakistan, while at the same time in areas slightly further to the west and south, including Chitral, the people still preferred to wear a turban. This would indicate that in lands even further to the west, the pakol was also still unknown.

The popularity of the pakol had moved west by the late 1920s, when Georg Morgenstierne visited the Chitral district and photographed the locals wearing a pakol, although the photographs seem to show that the pakol lacks the distinctive flat crown of the modern Chitrali cap and more resembles the type of pakol still worn in Hunza, which may thus well represent the "original" form of the pakol.

The Kafiristan campaign and adoption by Nuristanis 
Pakol is a fairly recent innovation in Nuristan Province, being introduced from neighbouring Chitral sometime in the late nineteenth century. According to the first proto-ethnographic documentations, the inhabitants of Kafiristan, the Nuristanis, went about without any headgear. They also used to shave their head, leaving a small patch on the crown where the hair is left to grow, hanging down often as far as the waist.

In the earliest source of the pakol in Nuristan by George Scott Robertson, he refers to the pakol as the Chitrali cap and states that it was only worn in the Bashgul valley, the easternmost valley of Kafiristan bordering Chitral, and the hat was acquired from Chitral in the further east through trade. Therefore, a relatively late introduction to Afghanistan, and in particular to Nuristan of the pakol seems indicated. This point is confirmed by the headgear worn by the men depicted in the huge woodcarvings, known as gandauws, for which the Kafiris were famous, which all date from before the Afghan occupation of Kafiristan in the late 1890s, where the men are shown wearing turbans. Additionally, the elderly and the young initiated among the Kalash, now living just across the border in Pakistan, also traditionally wore a turban, while all the others wore the pakol.

Pakols must have spread at a quick pace among the locals, now renamed Nuristanis, after and partially as a consequence of the conquest of Kafiristan by Abdul Rahman Khan of Afghanistan. The opening up of the valleys to increased contact and trade, and the population's conversion to Islam, induced the residents to abandon their previously distinctive hairstyle and cover their heads with hats. The adoption of specific items of clothing to mark a new identity, especially a religious one, is well established in history.

Initial prominence in Afghanistan
In the 1980s, the pakol gained popularity in large parts of Afghanistan as the favourite easy to wear headgear of the Mujahideen, who fought against the Democratic Republic of Afghanistan and their Soviet supporters. One of the most famous people wearing the pakol was the military leader of the Panjshir Valley Ahmad Shah Massoud. In those years, people from all over Afghanistan, but especially from among the Tajik population of Panjshir, who lived in an area bordering Nuristan, donned the pakol in order to show their opposition to the government.

In 1992 the Mujahideen took control of the capital Kabul, and since the Tajiks from the northeast of the country played a dominant role in the formation of the new government of Islamic State of Afghanistan, their pakol became the dominant headgear of the Afghan capital. However, the civil war between the various Mujahideen parties continued with the new appearance of the Taliban, who were mainly Pashtuns from the south of the country and opposed to the pakol wearing Mujahideen from the northeast. The Taliban used to wear turbans, the traditional Pashtun headgear, preferably the dark variety of Kandahar, while their opponents continued to wear the pakol. When the Taliban took control of Kabul in September 1996, the pakol disappeared from the streets, only to return when in November 2001, the Northern Alliance with the help of the American army managed to dispel the Taliban. At that time the pakol again gained popularity, while the Pashtuns from the south and southeast of the country, who used to form the core of the Taliban movement, still preferred to wear a turban.

Initial prominence in India
The pakol has been worn traditionally in India by the Shina people of northern Jammu and Kashmir's Gurez Valley (including Tulail). The Pakol has also been worn in the Kashmir valley occasionally for decades, where it was introduced by seasonal migrants of ethnic Shins/Dards, hailing from Gurez. A columnist with a valley based newspaper, said about the cap that it became popular in the 1950s after being sported by Bakshi Ghulam Mohammad, the Chief Minister of Jammu and Kashmir. The pakol has become popular in other parts of India, such as in Delhi, it is also sold by Afghan living in India. It also gained popularity in Muslim majority areas in northern India, especially areas around shrines where the twisted variety is especially popular.

Different types of pakol 
Within Pakistan and Afghanistan, there are different types of pakol worn by various ethnic groups and regions. These difference lie in shapes and styles, and are sometimes unique to a certain region or ethnic group.

Traditional pakol 
The traditional pakol hat is a soft, woollen hat that is flat, and rims are rolled into the headwear to be worn. It is made out of wool and comes in a variety of colours, usually natural earth colours being the most popularly worn. It is mainly worn in Khyber Pakhtunkhwa province, Gilgit-Baltistan, Afghanistan and recently in the Kashmir valley.

Chitrali pakol 
The Chitrali pakol is worn by the Chitral Scouts of Northern Pakistan. It is white, has a markhor insignia, and dons a peacock feather. It is considered a sign of dignity and honour amongst the Chitrali community and they usually present it to famous guests. This style of pakol is unique to the region. Princess Diana, Kate Middleton and Prince William wore it during their visits to Pakistan.

Twisted pakol 
Twisted pakol is another variant of the pakol; it has two layers and the rims are twisted. It is made with pure wool and comes in different colours and sizes. Twisted pakol is common in Khyber Pakhtunkhwa, Afghanistan and Kashmir. It is lighter in weight and can be adjusted more easily than the traditional one.

Waziristan pakol 
Worn in Waziristan, tribal areas of Pakistan, this type of pakol is usually and almost uniquely worn by the Pashtuns of Waziristan such as the Mahsud, Dawar, and Wazir tribes. The stark difference between the Waziristan pakol, and the regular pakol, is that it is larger in size, and the edges are curved ridges. It is unique to the Waziristan regions and is also made out of pure wool, available in different colours, just like the traditional pakol. It is also worn by Kin Pashtun tribes across the border in Afghanistan in Paktia and Khost provinces; usually they are also decorated with flowers, Unlike the Chitralis who decorate it with feathers. It is considered a commons men's headwear.

See also
Himachali cap
Beret

References

Further reading 

 Willem Vogelsang, 'The Pakol: A distinctive, but apparently not so very old headgear from the Indo-Iranian borderlands'. Khil`a. Journal for Dress and Textiles of the Islamic World, Vol. 2, 2006, pp. 149–155.

Hats
Pakistani clothing
Pakistani headgear
Culture of Gilgit-Baltistan
Indian clothing
Indian headgear